Klinovka may refer to:
Klinovka, Republic of Mordovia, a village (selo) in the Republic of Mordovia, Russia
Klinovka, name of several other rural localities in Russia
Zheleznodorozhnogo razyezda Klinovka, a settlement in the Republic of Tatarstan, Russia